Our Lady of Darkness (1977) is an urban fantasy novel by American author Fritz Leiber. The novel is distinguished for three elements: the heavily autobiographical elements in the story, the use of Jungian psychology that informs the narrative, and its detailed description of "Megapolisomancy", a fictional occult science. It was originally published in shorter form as "The Pale Brown Thing" (Magazine of Fantasy and Science Fiction, January/February 1977).

Autobiographical elements

Like the protagonist Franz Westen, Leiber was recovering from his wife's death a number of years previously and descending into alcoholism. Like the author, Westen is an amateur astronomer who is looking for ways to re-engage with the life around him, and who lives at the address (811 Geary St) where Leiber lived at the time. The novel is set in actual San Francisco locations, including Corona Heights and the Sutro Tower behind it. As late as 2012, fantasy fans could take a walking tour of the city that included all the novel's main locations. Several of the other characters are thinly disguised versions of people active in Bay Area fandom in the mid-1970s.

The novel mentions authors like Jack London, Ambrose Bierce, and the baroque poet Clark Ashton Smith, who lived part of their lives in San Francisco. The title is taken from Thomas De Quincey's Suspiria de Profundis, and references are also made to M. R. James's ghost stories, and to the work of fantasy/horror writers such as H.P. Lovecraft. These allusions add an element of metafiction to the story, making it almost as much an examination and description of horror and the imagination.

Jungian elements

Adding to the metafiction elements of the story are Leiber's frequent references to Jung's descriptions of the Anima (female self) and Shadow (hidden self). These are elements that existed in Leiber's work nearly since the start of his career in the late 1930s, according to Bruce Byfield's Witches of the Mind: A Critical Study of Fritz Leiber. The main difference in Our Lady of Darkness is that, unlike much of his earlier works, the references to these figures are explicit, rather than implied, and at times supported by direct quotes.

The Pale Brown Thing

Our Lady of Darkness was originally serialised, in shorter form, and with the title The Pale Brown Thing, over two issues of the Magazine of Fantasy and Science Fiction (January/February 1977). The story was featured on the cover of the January issue with a painting by Ron Walotsky.

Fritz Leiber maintained that the two texts "should be regarded as the same story told at different times."

The Pale Brown Thing was reissued by Swan River Press in 2016 as a limited edition hardback. The cover by Jason Zerrillo is an homage to Walotsky's original artwork for F&SF. The volume includes an introduction by Leiber's friend, the San Francisco poet Donald Sidney-Fryer, who was the basis for the character of Jaime Donaldus Byers. It also includes a reprint of an essay by John Howard, "Story-telling Wonder-questing, Mortal Me: The Transformation of The Pale Brown Thing into Our Lady of Darkness", which examines the differences between The Pale Brown Thing and its later, lengthier incarnation.

Reception
Fritz Leiber won the World Fantasy Award for Best Novel in 1978 for Our Lady of Darkness.

Richard A. Lupoff praised Our Lady of Darkness as "one of the scariest, most original, and most damnably convincing fantasy notions I've ever come across."

See also
False document
Fritz Leiber
Kult, a role playing game with some similar ideas on the quirks of big cities
Geomancy

References

External links
"Fritz Leiber Reading an Extract from Our Lady of Darkness"
"Fritz Leiber Discussing the Composition and Background of The Pale Brown Thing"
"The Power of Friendship: An Interview with Donald Sidney-Fryer"
Perry Lake, "Stalking Our Lady of Darkness"
Rosemary Pardoe, "Our Lady of Darkness: A Jamesian Classic"

1977 American novels
1977 fantasy novels
Novels by Fritz Leiber
Berkley Books books
Novels set in San Francisco
World Fantasy Award for Best Novel-winning works